Cychramus adustus is a species of sap-feeding beetle in the family Nitidulidae. It is found in North America.

Subspecies
These two subspecies belong to the species Cychramus adustus:
 Cychramus adustus adustus
 Cychramus adustus bicolor Horn, 1879

References

Further reading

 

Nitidulidae
Articles created by Qbugbot
Beetles described in 1843